Sport Lisboa e Benfica, commonly known as Benfica, is a professional roller hockey team based in Lisbon, Portugal.

Founded in 1917, Benfica play in the Portuguese first division, having won 23 league titles, 15 Portuguese Cups, eight Portuguese Super Cups, one 1947 Cup and one Elite Cup.

Internationally, Benfica have won, among other trophies, two CERH European League, two CERS Cup, three CERH Continental Cup, two Intercontinental Cup and one Golden Cup.

History

International success
Benfica's only European trophy up to the season of 2009–10 had been a CERS Cup (excluding a Montreux Nations Cup and a CERH Ciudad de Vigo Tournament), but in 2010–11 the club's European fate began to change. They made their way up to the 2010–11 CERS Cup Final Four, eventually winning the trophy for the second time (defeating CP Vilanova in the final by 6–4, at their home ground). With this victory, Benfica had the chance to play the CERH Continental Cup against the CERH European League winner HC Liceo La Coruña. The opponent refused to play the cup's final and Benfica won it by 10–0 (disqualification), conquering their first Continental Cup.

On 2 June 2013, Benfica won their first CERH European League defeating FC Porto at Dragão Caixa by 6–5 (aet), in an all Portuguese final. That made them the fourth Portuguese team to lift the most important clubs European trophy. On 2 November 2013, Benfica won their second Continental Cup defeating CE Vendrell of Spain (5–3, 5–0), thus becoming the only Portuguese club to win the trophy twice. On 16 November 2013, Benfica won the Intercontinental Cup, defeating Sport Recife by 10–3 and winning the only missing trophy for the club and the second one for Portuguese roller hockey, after the 1993 Óquei de Barcelos win.

On 15 March 2015, Benfica became the second European club, after CP Voltregà, to win CERH's most important club title in both men and women competitions, after defeating the French team Coutras in the final of the Women's European Cup. Domestically, earlier that season, the women's section had conquered the national Super Cup on 8 November 2014, and later also won their third consecutive national championship on 8 June 2015, and their second consecutive domestic cup on 14 June, accomplishing the treble, and winning all five competitions they played, including the Torneio de Abertura. Later, on 16 May, Benfica's men squad became Portuguese champions without defeat, totalling 25 wins and one draw.

On 15 May 2016, Benfica were crowned European champions for the second time, after beating Oliveirense in the final 5–3. Five months later, Benfica beat Óquei de Barcelos (9–2) in the second leg of the Continental Cup, and won the trophy for a third time.

On 16 December 2017, Benfica beat Reus Deportiu (3–5) and won their second Intercontinental Cup, thus becoming the second team with most trophies in the competition.

Current squad

Men's technical staff

{| class="wikitable"
|-
! Position
! Name
|-
| Head coach
| Nuno Resende
|-
| Assistant coach
| Eduardo Marques
|-
| Physiologist
| Filipe Pedro
|-
| Physiotherapist
| Ricardo Fonseca
|-
| Team Manager
| Valter Neves
|-

Honours

According to Benfica's official website

Domestic
 Portuguese First Division
 Winners (23): 1950–51, 1951–52, 1955–56, 1956–57, 1959–60, 1960–61, 1965–66, 1966–67, 1967–68, 1969–70, 1971–72, 1973–74, 1978–79, 1979–80, 1980–81, 1991–92, 1993–94, 1994–95, 1996–97, 1997–98, 2011–12, 2014–15, 2015–16
 Portuguese Cup
 Winners (15): 1962–63, 1977–78, 1978–79, 1979–80, 1980–81, 1981–82, 1990–91, 1993–94, 1994–95, 1999–2000, 2000–01, 2001–02, 2009–10, 2013–14, 2014–15
 Portuguese Super Cup
 Winners (8): 1993, 1995, 1997, 2001, 2002, 2010, 2012, 2022
 1947 Cup
 Winners – record: 2020
 Elite Cup
 Winners: 2017

European
 WSE Champions League
 Winners (2): 2012–13, 2015–16
 World Skate Europe Cup
 Winners (2): 1990–91, 2010–11
 Continental Cup
 Winners (3): 2011, 2013, 2016
 Nations Cup
 Winners: 1962
 CERH Ciudad de Vigo Tournament
 Winners: 2008
 Golden Cup
 Winners – record: 2022

Worldwide
 Intercontinental Cup
 Winners (2): 2013, 2017

Women's current squad

Women's honours

Regional
 Opening Tournament of Lisbon Roller Sports Association
 Winners (8): 2012, 2013, 2014, 2015, 2016, 2017, 2018, 2019

National
 Portuguese League
 Winners (9) – record: 2012–13, 2013–14, 2014–15, 2015–16, 2016–17, 2017–18, 2018–19, 2020–21, 2021–22
 Portuguese Cup
 Winners (8) – record: 2013–14, 2014–15, 2015–16, 2016–17, 2017–18, 2018–19, 2020–21, 2021–22
 Portuguese Super Cup
 Winners (9) – record: 2013, 2014, 2015, 2016, 2017, 2018, 2019, 2021, 2022
 Elite Cup
 Winners (1) – record: 2022

European
 Rink Hockey European Female League
 Winners: 2014–15

References

External links
  

 
Roller hockey
Rink hockey clubs in Portugal
1917 establishments in Portugal